Paul (Yazigi) of Aleppo (also known as Boulos Yazigi; born 1959) was the metropolitan of the archdiocese of Aleppo, Syria, of the Church of Antioch.

Life
Born in 1959 in the coastal city of Latakia (Syria) into a very devout Christian family, he was active in the church as a youth. After graduating in 1985 from the Tishreen University with a Civil Engineering degree, he was ordained a deacon and studied theology at the University of Thessaloniki, gaining a Bachelor's degree in 1989, a Master's degree in 1992 and a Doctor of Philosophy. He also studied at Mount Athos.

Paul was ordained to the priesthood in 1992 and was Dean of the Institute of Theology from 1994 to 2000 when he was elected Metropolitan of Aleppo, being enthroned in Aleppo on October 22. He succeeded Youssef (Elias), bishop of Aleppo from 1971 to 2000. His brother is John X, currently the Greek Orthodox Patriarch of Antioch.

Kidnapping
In 2013, Paul, along with Syriac Orthodox Archbishop of Aleppo Yohanna Ibrahim, was abducted by militants in the Syrian Civil war; his whereabouts was unknown for several years. The Rewards for Justice Program offers $5 million for information on the ISIS network responsible for kidnapping Christian clerics: Maher Mahfouz, Michael Kayyal, Yohanna Ibrahim and Paolo Dall'Oglio, as well as Boulos Yazigi.

In January 2020, an investigative report published by Mansur Salib, a self-described "Syrian citizen in the United States", alleged that both bishops were killed in 2016.

In October 2021, the Antiochian Synod in Balamand made the decision to transfer him to the honorary diocese of Diyarbakir due to his remaining in captivity.

See also
List of kidnappings

Gallery

References

1959 births
2010s missing person cases
21st-century Eastern Orthodox bishops
Aristotle University of Thessaloniki alumni
Greek Orthodox Christians from Syria
Living people
Missing people
Missing person cases in Syria
People from Latakia
Syrian archbishops
Tishreen University alumni